Maligne Mountain is a  multi-peak massif located east of Maligne Lake in Jasper National Park, in the Canadian Rockies of Alberta, Canada. Maligne Mountain is surrounded by glaciers, and its nearest higher peak is Monkhead,  to the south. 


History
The peak was first named by Mary Schäffer in 1911 because she thought one peak should bear the name of Maligne Lake. Mary "discovered" Maligne Lake and she named many of the mountains around it, including Mount Charlton, Mount Unwin, and Mount Warren. The mountain's name was officially adopted in 1946 by the Geographical Names Board of Canada. 

The first ascent of Maligne Mountain was made in 1930 by W.R. Hainsworth, J.F. Lehmann, M.M. Strumia, and N.D. Waffl.

Climate
Based on the Köppen climate classification, Maligne Mountain is located in a subarctic climate with cold, snowy winters, and mild summers. Temperatures can drop below  with wind chill factors below .

See also
List of mountains in the Canadian Rockies
Geography of Alberta

References

External links
 Weather forecast
 Parks Canada web site: Jasper National Park

Three-thousanders of Alberta
Mountains of Jasper National Park
Canadian Rockies
Alberta's Rockies